is a Japanese short track speed skater. She competed in two events at the 1998 Winter Olympics.

References

External links
 

1976 births
Living people
Japanese female short track speed skaters
Olympic short track speed skaters of Japan
Short track speed skaters at the 1998 Winter Olympics
Sportspeople from Tokyo